Syosset High School (SHS) is a public high school located in Syosset, New York, United States, in Nassau County, on Long Island. It serves as the public high school for residents of the Syosset Central School District. As of 2012, the news magazine Newsweek ranked the high school 42nd best in the United States. Syosset High School has been ranked #7 in New York by niche.com as of 2022.

As of the 2021–22 school year, the school had an enrollment of 2,237 students and 214.9 classroom teachers (on an FTE basis), for a student–teacher ratio of 10.4:1. There were 213 students (9.5% of enrollment) eligible for free lunch and 20 (0.9% of students) eligible for reduced-cost lunch.

Overview 
The school district as a whole was the 2002 winner of the Kennedy Center Alliance for Arts Education Network and National School Boards Association Award, which honors school districts for excellence in arts education.  Syosset was also named a Grammy Signature school for its music programs in orchestra, band, and chorus. In 2010, it was rated 14th in the country for music education by the National Association for Music Education. Syosset High School ranked 143rd of 1600+ schools listed in Newsweeks 2010 Best High Schools list.

Eleanor Roosevelt was among the first notable people to make a personal appearance in the auditorium.

In April 2007, the school's Quiz Bowl team won an online national championship.

Castle Program 

The Castle Program is designed for students (non-special education) who need a different environment in order to succeed. These students typically have a history of poor class and school attendance. They meet in a separate setting with small class sizes and a close-knit team of teachers who focus on "realistic expectations." Participation in this program is voluntary.

WKWZ
WKWZ, 88.5 FM, is a broadcasting station owned and operated by the Syosset Central School District that operates from 2:30–11:00 pm Monday through Friday. It is licensed by the Federal Communications Commission (FCC). WPOB broadcasts on the same frequency from 7:00–2:30 from Plainview-Old Bethpage John F. Kennedy High School, and is the sister station to WKWZ.  The General Manager is head of the Syosset Film and Radio department, David Favilla, with all other positions (other than General Manager, Station Supervisor and Chief Engineer) operated by students in the school, with positions such as Station Managers, Music Director, Sports Director, Traffic Director, Program Director, Community News Director, and Organizational Supervisors.

Sports 
 The boys' swim team has been undefeated since the 2015-16 season, going 70-0 in the dual meet season as of 2023. Te team won its 5th straight Conference 1 title.
 The football team won the 1974 New York State Championship and the Long Island Championship in 2014.
 The girls' soccer team won the Nassau County Championships in 2018.
 The tennis team won the Nassau County Championships in 2015, 2016, 2017, and 2018. They won the Long Island Championship in 2017 and 2018. They had 3 consecutive undefeated regular seasons from 2015-2017. The Syosset Boys Varsity tennis team has consistently been the top, and most competitive, high school tennis team in Long Island since 2015.
 The boys' lacrosse team won the Long Island Championship in 2008 and 2015.
 The girls' lacrosse team won the Nassau County Championships in 2015.
 The boys' cross country team won ten back-to-back Nassau County titles from 1996 to 2006. The cross country and track and field teams have won eleven back-to-back county titles from 2012 to 2016. On February 5, 2005, athletes Chris Howell, Adam Lampert, Dan Tully and Sean Tully set the national indoor record in the 4 × 800 metres relay in a time of 7:42.22. The same team won national championships at the National Scholastic Indoor Championships and Nike Outdoor Nationals and won the 4 × 800 metres relay at the prestigious Penn Relays on April 29, 2005.
 The boys' soccer team won the Nassau County Championship in 2012.
 The boys ice hockey team won the Nassau County Championship in 2015.
 The Girls Varsity Gymnastics team won the Nassau County Championship in 2019, 2021, 2022.
 The Co-Ed Track and Field Team won the Nassau County Championship in 2019

Substitute Enrichment Program 
In the 1970s, SHS was known for a unique program called Substitute Enrichment Program, considered innovative at the time. Rather than call in substitute teachers, the funds that would have gone to pay the sub were used to help bring in special guest speakers and class-long programs. When a teacher was absent, students had the option to attend the Sub Program or go to study hall. Run by a staff advisor and a team of student volunteers, the programming was often quite notable. At times, teachers worked the program's contents into their class and brought their classes to the session. Students that attended SHS in the early 1970s remember seeing Issac Asimov, talking with the late Harry Chapin in the "Little Theater." Programming included sports figures, artists, even learning to decorate cakes.

Breaking Borders 
In the 2010s, Syosset Students created a program titled, Breaking Borders. This program works to mitigate the racial and socioeconomic boundaries on Long Island. Their mission statements reads, "Breaking Borders is a leadership program that aims to eliminate ethnic, socio-economic, racial, and religious barriers which separate students from different Long Island districts. Through structured conversations with students from other school districts, Breaking Borders enables its members to challenge their biases and opinions by exposing them to new perspectives on important issues, such as race, religion, gender, and privilege". When asked about why Breaking Borders was created, the founders noted that Long Island is the one of the most segregated parts of the United States due to a long history of racism due to housing and community planning, and that in the 21st Century that should be fixed. The name Breaking Borders comes from the idea that students work to "break" the "borders" between their peers from various communities around Long Island. Today, the programs has significantly grown to include school from all around Long Island. Some of the schools include Freeport, Elmont, Massapequa, Division High School, and MacArthur High School. Today, the program is more successful than ever as student leaders plan multi-school meetings once a month where members of the program can speak to each other and work to "break borders".

Notable alumni

 Judd Apatow (born 1967), screenwriter, director, and producer
 Lesley Arfin (born 1979), television writer and author, Girls, Love, Brooklyn 99
 Vito Arujau (born 1999), NCAA Division I All-American wrestler
 Jay Bienstock (born 1965), Emmy award-winning television producer of Survivor, The Apprentice, and The Voice
 Sue Bird (born 1980) Israeli-American Women's National Basketball Association point guard, four-time WNBA champion, five-time Olympic champion, thirteen-time All-Star (Seattle Storm) (She attended Syosset High School but graduated from Christ the King Regional High School)
 Alan Blinder (born 1945), economist, author, and former Vice Chairman of the Board of Governors of the Federal Reserve System
 Rosa Brooks (born 1970), writer, law professor, former Department of Defense staff member (formerly known as Rosa Ehrenreich)
 Elaine Chao (born 1953), former Secretary of Transportation, first Asian American woman to be appointed a cabinet member, wife of Senate Minority Leader Mitch McConnell
 George Drakoulias (born 1965), music producer, music supervisor
 Ben Ehrenreich (born 1972), journalist and novelist
 Alan Eichler – theatrical publicist, producer and talent manager
 Sibel Galindez – actress
 Paul Ginsparg – physicist
 Jerry Gershenhorn – historian
 Brooke Gladstone – journalist and media analyst
 Wayne Gladstone – writer and humorist
 Rick Hodes – medical doctor known for work in the developing world
 Brenda Howard – political activist
 Michael Isikoff – Newsweek journalist
 Kathleen Kim - puppeteer behind the Sesame Street character Ji-Young, the show’s first Asian American Muppet 
 Mitchell Lazar – physician-scientist
 Kenneth Lin – playwright
 Jon Lovett – former Presidential speechwriter for Barack Obama and current podcast host
 Carolyne Mas – singer-songwriter
 Robert Maschio – actor, Scrubs
 Idina Menzel – actress and singer
 Ed Newman (born 1951), National Football League All-Pro football player
 Jeff Panzer – music video executive
 Adam Pascal – actor and singer
 Michael Pollan (1973) – writer
 Tracy Pollan – actress
 Natalie Portman - Israeli-American actress
 Liz Rosenberg – poet, novelist, children's book author
 Gabe Rotter (born 1978), novelist, television writer and producer
 Jim Rowinski – NBA player
 Dave Rubin – comedian and television personality
 John C. Russell – playwright
 Carl Safina – conservationist and author
 Brandon Taubman – baseball executive, former assistant general manager for the Houston Astros
 Doug Varone – choreographer
 Barry Weiss – Chairman of BMG Label Group
 Meg Wolitzer – novelist
Irad Young (born 1971) - American-Israeli soccer player 
 Jordan Young – television producer and writer

In Popular Culture
Syosset High was often referenced in Mort Drucker's artwork for MAD Magazine.

References

External links
 
 

Syosset, New York
Educational institutions established in 1956
Public high schools in New York (state)
Schools in Nassau County, New York
1956 establishments in New York (state)